This is a list of the largest trading partners of the People's Republic of China.

Background
China has become the world's second largest economy by GDP (Nominal) and largest by GDP (PPP).

'China developed a network of economic relations with both industrial economies and those constituting the semi-periphery and periphery of the world system.' Due to the rapid growth of China's economy, the nation has developed many trading partners throughout the world. All trading partners are considered important to the development of the Chinese economy, however the title of China's largest partners are ever-changing due to national and international policy changes.

The expansion of the Chinese economy grew 6.8% the last quarter of 2017, equaling the growth of the prior 3 months exceeding expectations of 6.7%. The overall economy expanded 6.9% last year, just beating the 6.7% of 2016 which ended a drought of a declining trend that started in 2011.

List of largest trading partners of China
The major Chinese trading partners for 2022 were as follows:

China is the largest trading partner of many countries. The following tables are based on 2016 data as shown on the CIA World Factbook.

See also
Economy of China
Internationalization of the renminbi
List of countries by leading trade partners
List of the largest trading partners of the United States
List of the largest trading partners of the ASEAN

References

Foreign trade of China
Trading partners
Lists of trading partners